Christiane Demontès (born 14 May 1954) is a former member of the Senate of France. She represented the Rhône department and is a member of the Socialist Party.

References
Page on the Senate website

1954 births
Living people
French Senators of the Fifth Republic
Socialist Party (France) politicians
Women members of the Senate (France)
Senators of Rhône (department)